Operation Collar was the codeword for the first commando raid conducted by the British forces during the Second World War. The location selected for the raid was the Pas-de-Calais department on the French coast. The British Commandos had not long been formed and were not yet trained, so the operation was given to No. 11 Independent Company under the command of Major Ronnie Tod.

The raid's objective was the reconnaissance of four locations and the capture of prisoners. Over the night of 24–25 June 1940, 115 men of No. 11 Independent Company carried out the operation, but they failed to gather any intelligence or damage any German equipment; their only success was in killing two German sentries.

Background 
After the British Expeditionary Force had been evacuated from Dunkirk in 1940, Prime Minister Winston Churchill called for a force to be assembled and equipped to inflict casualties on the Germans and bolster British morale. Churchill told the joint Chiefs of Staff to propose measures for an offensive against German-occupied Europe, and stated: "They must be prepared with specially trained troops of the hunter class who can develop a reign of terror down the enemy coast."

One staff officer, Lieutenant-Colonel Dudley Clarke, had already submitted such a proposal to General Sir John Dill, the Chief of the Imperial General Staff. Dill, aware of Churchill's intentions, approved Clarke's proposal. The Commandos came under the operational control of the Combined Operations Headquarters. The man initially selected as the commander was Admiral Sir Roger Keyes, a veteran of the Gallipoli Campaign and the Zeebrugge Raid in the First World War.

In 1940, the call went out for volunteers from among the serving Army soldiers within certain formations still in Britain, and men of the disbanding divisional Independent Companies originally raised from Territorial Army divisions who had seen service in the Norwegian Campaign. By the autumn of 1940 more than 2,000 men had volunteered for commando training.

Under pressure from Winston Churchill to start raiding operations, Combined Operation Headquarters came up with Operation Collar. The objective of Operation Collar was to be a reconnaissance of the French coast and to capture prisoners. The raid was to take place just three weeks after Operation Dynamo, the evacuation of the British Expeditionary Force from Dunkirk, and the French had just signed the Second Armistice at Compiègne with Germany on 22 June 1940. The newly formed British Commandos were not yet adequately trained and most units were still short of troops. So one of the independent companies which were in the process of being absorbed into the commandos was selected. The unit chosen was No. 11 Independent Company, under the command of Major Ronnie Tod of the Argyll and Sutherland Highlanders. No. 11 Company had been raised after the other Independent Companies on  14 June 1940. They were formed by asking for volunteers from the men already serving in the other companies and  had an establishment of 25 officers and 350 other ranks.

Mission 
Having been selected to carry out the first commando raid on occupied France, No. 11 Independent Company was moved from its base in Scotland to the south coast British seaport of Southampton. On arrival it conducted a number of exercises against a local infantry battalion on the River Hamble. During the exercise the men discovered the boats they had been supplied with were not good enough to transport them across the English Channel.  Having no other dedicated transport of their own, the Royal Air Force (RAF) was approached for the use of four of its air sea rescue boats based at Dover, Ramsgate and Newhaven.

The raid would be carried out by 115 officers and other ranks, who were divided into four groups. Each group would be landed on one of the target beaches at Neufchâtel-Hardelot, Stella Plage, Berck and Le Touquet. They were to spend no more than 80 minutes ashore before returning to their boats. The RAF boats were not equipped for a mission like this and lacked exact navigation equipment and the compasses were known to be unreliable. Crossing the channel they also came to the notice of patrolling RAF aircraft who, not being aware of the mission, came in close to investigate. At around 02:00 hours on 24 June 1940, the boats reached France and put their men ashore.

The group that landed at Le Touquet had the Merlimont Plage Hotel as an objective. Intelligence had suggested that the Germans were using the hotel as a barracks. When the group reached the hotel they discovered it was empty and the doors and windows boarded up. Unable to find another target, they returned to the beach, only to discover their boat had put back out to sea. During the wait, two German sentries stumbled on the group and were quietly killed by the troops' bayonets. Another German patrol then approached across the sand dunes and the group was forced to swim out to the boat, leaving its weapons behind.

The group that landed at Hardelot penetrated several hundred yards inland and returned to its boat without meeting any Germans. The men that landed at Berck discovered a seaplane anchorage, but it was too heavily defended for them to risk any attack. The final group landed at Stella Plage under the command of Tod. It encountered a German patrol and in the short exchange of fire that followed, one man was slightly wounded.

Aftermath 
After the raiders safely returned to England, the Ministry of Information issued a communique:

Operation Collar met with mixed success; they killed two German sentries with their only casualty being Lieutenant Colonel Dudley Clark, along as an observer, who received a slight wound at Stella Plage.
Despite the limited success of the first commando operation, within a year Adolf Hitler when talking about the commandos referred to them as "terror and sabotage troops" who he said "acted outside of the Geneva convention". The German propaganda machine called them "murderous thugs and cut throats" who killed soldiers and civilians indiscriminately, preferring to murder their enemies rather than take prisoners.

Notes 
Footnotes

References

Bibliography 

Conflicts in 1940
World War II British Commando raids
1940 in France
History of the Royal Air Force during World War II
C
Amphibious operations involving the United Kingdom